Warwick Brown (born 24 December 1949 in Sydney) is a former racing driver from Australia.

Racing career
Brown participated in a single Formula One Grand Prix, on 10 October 1976. He drove a Wolf–Williams Racing car at the 1976 United States Grand Prix and finished 14th, five laps behind the winner James Hunt. Brown suffered the loss of third and fifth gears during the race, as well as rear brake problems.

Brown was more successful in the Tasman Series, which he won in 1975, driving a Lola T332 Chevrolet. He also won the Rothmans International Series in Australia twice, in 1977 driving a Lola T430 Chevrolet and in 1978 driving a Lola T332 Chevrolet, both for the VDS Team. In the course of winning these series Brown also won the 1975 New Zealand Grand Prix and the 1977 Australian Grand Prix.

After competing in the SCCA/USAC Formula 5000 Championship in North America from 1974 to 1976, Brown contested the Can-Am Series and was the runnerup to fellow Australian Alan Jones in the 1978 US Can-Am Series driving a Lola T333CS-Chevrolet for the VDS Team.

Career summary

Complete Formula One results
(key)

References

Profile at www.grandprix.com

External links
Tasman Series Retrieved from www.sergent.com.au on 22 July 2009
Formula 5000 in New Zealand & Australia Retrieved from Google Books on 22 July 2009
Formula A and Formula 5000 in America Retrieved from Google Books on 22 July 2009

Living people
1949 births
Australian Formula One drivers
Wolf Formula One drivers
Tasman Series drivers
Sportsmen from New South Wales
Racing drivers from Sydney